Tänndalen, Southern Sami: Teanndaelie, is a minor locality in Härjedalen Municipality, Sweden. It had 66 inhabitants in 2010.

References

External links
 - taken around the area

Populated places in Härjedalen Municipality